Friedhelm is a name of Germanic origin. It may refer to:

Friedhelm Busse (1929–2008), German national socialist politician and activist
Friedhelm Döhl (born 1936), German composer and professor of music
Friedhelm Eronat (born 1953), Geneva-based millionaire business leader in oil trading, exploration and production
Friedhelm Funkel (born 1953), German football manager and former player
Friedhelm Haebermann (born 1946), former German football player and manager
Friedhelm Hardy (1943–2004), Professor of Indian Religions, teaching at King's College London
Friedhelm Hengsbach, professor emeritus for Christian social ethics
Friedhelm Konietzka (1938–2012), German football striker and manager
Friedhelm Sack (born 1956), Namibian sport shooter
Friedhelm Schütte (born 1957), former professional German footballer
Friedhelm Waldhausen (born 1938), German mathematician known for his work in algebraic topology
Friedhelm Wentzke (born 1935), German sprint canoeist who competed in the early to mid-1960s

See also
 Hurricane Bawbag, storm officially named Friedhelm
Fedelm
Friede
Friedel
Friedl

Germanic given names